Murun Buchstansangur is a series of animated shorts produced by Bevanfield Films for the TV station Channel 4 in the United Kingdom. It comprised fifty-two episodes; each was written, directed and narrated by Timothy Forder.

Content
The title character was a small blue-grey creature who lived under the kitchen cupboard of a house in an unspecified town. The series was notable for its oblique, downbeat tone. Perhaps unsurprisingly, given his surroundings, Murun was a somewhat melancholy, philosophical character, though he was not lonely - in fact he had quite a large number of friends, neighbours, family members and acquaintances. Rather than Murun having exciting adventures, the narrative of each episode usually centred on a problem or dilemma that Murun would ponder, sometimes helped by his friends and relatives.

The first episode was shown in 1982; fifty-two were made, and the animation was repeated until 1996, mostly as filler material in scheduling gaps between other programmes. The first few series were created by Bevanfield Films, while latter series were made Hierographics Production Studio in Soho.http://www.anorakzone.com/murunrank1.html

Episode guide
 Series 1: 13 episodes:  14 November 1982 - 21 November 1982 followed by 6 November 1983 - 18 November 1983. 
 Series 2: TBA
 Series 3: TBA
 Series 4: TBA

External links and references
IMDb entry
Murun Buchstansangur at The Anorak Zone 
Murun Buchstansangur at LittleGems - includes a detailed summary of the first episode.
Murun Buchstansangur at Toonhound

Specific

1980s British animated television series
British children's animated adventure television series
Channel 4 original programming